The 2015 Red Bull Air Race of Abu Dhabi was the first round of the 2015 Red Bull Air Race World Championship season, the tenth season of the Red Bull Air Race World Championship. The event was held in Abu Dhabi, the capital of the United Arab Emirates.

Paul Bonhomme from Great Britain took the opening race victory, finishing 0.084 seconds ahead of Australian pilot Matt Hall. The podium was completed by Canada's Pete McLeod, after Hannes Arch received a two-second time penalty. In the Challenger class, Chile's Cristian Bolton took the opening win ahead of Petr Kopfstein from the Czech Republic, while Mikaël Brageot completed the podium, after Daniel Ryfa received a two-second time penalty.

Master Class

Qualification

Round of 14

 Pilot received 2 seconds in penalties
 Pilot received 4 seconds in penalties
 Pilot received 8 seconds in penalties

Round of 8

 Pilot received 1 second in penalties
 Pilot received 2 seconds in penalties

Final 4

Challenger Class

Results

Standings after the event

Master Class standings

Challenger Class standings

 Note: Only the top five positions are included for both sets of standings.

References

External links

|- style="text-align:center"
|width="35%"|Previous race:2014 Red Bull Air Race of Spielberg
|width="30%"|Red Bull Air Race2015 season
|width="35%"|Next race:2015 Red Bull Air Race of Chiba
|- style="text-align:center"
|width="35%"|Previous race:2014 Red Bull Air Race of Abu Dhabi
|width="30%"|Red Bull Air Race of Abu Dhabi
|width="35%"|Next race:2016 Red Bull Air Race of Abu Dhabi
|- style="text-align:center"

Abu Dhabi
Red Bull Air Race World Championship